Baishevo (Bayış) is a rural locality (a village) in Ibrayevsky Selsoviet, Aurgazinsky District, Bashkortostan, Russia. The population was 54 as of 2010. There is one street.

Geography 
Baishevo is located 16 km north of Tolbazy (the district's administrative centre) by road. Borisovka is the nearest rural locality.

References 

Rural localities in Aurgazinsky District